Bruno Santos (born July 17, 1987) is a Brazilian mixed martial artist currently fighting in the Middleweight division of the World Series of Fighting now known as Professional Fighters League and is currently ranked as #1 contender for the belt.

Mixed martial arts career

Early career
Santos faced Danilo Pereira on August 29, 2009, at Win Fight & Entertainment 4 for the WFE Middleweight Championship, winning via unanimous decision.

Bellator MMA
Undefeated at 12–0, Santos made his Bellator debut against Giva Santana at Bellator 61 on March 16, 2012. Though a considerable underdog coming into the fight, Santos would win the fight via unanimous decision, remaining undefeated in the process.

He was then expected to face Brian Rogers on April 20, 2012 at Bellator 66, however Santos was forced out of the bout due to a shoulder injury.

Ultimate Fighting Championship
Little over a year after his win over Giva Santana, Santos was signed by the UFC and made his debut against fellow newcomer Krzysztof Jotko on December 7, 2013, at UFC Fight Night: Hunt vs. Bigfoot. Santos lost the fight via unanimous decision.

Santos faced Chris Camozzi at UFC 175 on July 5, 2014. He won the fight by split decision.

Santos next faced Elias Theodorou on October 4, 2014 at UFC Fight Night: MacDonald vs. Saffiedine. He lost the fight via unanimous decision and was subsequently released from the promotion.

World Series of Fighting
On December 31, 2016, Santos made his World Series of Fighting debut at WSOF 34 against undefeated Vagab Vagabov. He won the fight via split decision.

On July 29, 2017 Bruno Santos defeated Rex Harris in a middleweight bout at “PFL: Everett,” the second event for the newly formed Professional Fighters League bringing his professional MMA record to 16-2.

Championships and accomplishments
 Win Fight & Entertainment
 WFE Middleweight Championship (One time)

Mixed martial arts record

 
|- 
|Loss
|align=center|18–4–1
|Artem Frolov
|KO (punch)
|ACA 104: Goncharov vs. Vakhaev
|
|align=center|2
|align=center|2:56
|Krasnodar, Russia
|
|-
|Loss
|align=center| 18–3–1  
|Vyacheslav Babkin
|TKO (punches)
|ACA 97: Goncharov vs. Johnson 2
|
|align=center| 1
|align=center| 2:33
|Krasnodar, Russia
|  
|-
|Draw
|align=center|18–2–1
|Sadibou Sy
|Draw (majority)
|PFL 10
|
|align=center|2
|align=center|5:00
|Washington, D.C., United States
|
|-
|Win
|align=center| 18–2
|John Howard
|Decision (unanimous)
|PFL 6 
|
|align=center|3
|align=center|5:00
|Atlantic City, New Jersey, United States
|
|-
|Win
|align=center|17–2
|Sadibou Sy
|Decision (unanimous)
|PFL 3 
|
|align=center|3
|align=center|5:00
|Washington, D.C., United States
|  
|-
|Win
|align=center|16–2
|Rex Harrison 
|Decision (unanimous)
|PFL: Everett (Harrison vs. Rodriquez)
|
|align=center|3
|align=center|5:00
|Everett, Washington , United States
|
|-
|Win
|align=center|15–2
|Vagab Vagabov
|Decision (split)
|WSOF 34
|
|align=center|3
|align=center|5:00
|New York City, New York, United States
|
|-
|Loss
|align=center|14–2
|Elias Theodorou
|Decision (unanimous)
|UFC Fight Night: MacDonald vs. Saffiedine
|
|align=center|3
|align=center|5:00
|Halifax, Nova Scotia, Canada
|
|-
|Win
|align=center|14–1
|Chris Camozzi
|Decision (split)
|UFC 175
|
|align=center|3
|align=center|5:00
|Las Vegas, Nevada, United States
| 
|-
|Loss
|align=center|13–1
|Krzysztof Jotko
|Decision (unanimous)
|UFC Fight Night: Hunt vs. Bigfoot
|
|align=center|3
|align=center|5:00
|Brisbane, Australia
| 
|-
|Win
|align=center|13–0
|Giva Santana
|Decision (unanimous)
|Bellator 61
|
|align=center|3
|align=center|5:00
|Bossier City, Louisiana, United States
| 
|-
|Win
|align=center|12–0
|Paulo Henrique Garcia Rodrigues
|Decision (unanimous)
|WFE 10 - Platinum
|
|align=center|3
|align=center|5:00
|Salvador, Brazil
| 
|-
|Win
|align=center|11–0
|Julio Cesar dos Santos
|Decision (unanimous)
|Bitetti Combat 9 - Middleweight Combat Cup
|
|align=center|3
|align=center|5:00
|Rio de Janeiro, Brazil
|
|-
|Win
|align=center|10–0
|Vitor Nobrega
|Decision (unanimous)
|Bitetti Combat 9 - Middleweight Combat Cup
|
|align=center|2
|align=center|5:00
|Rio de Janeiro, Brazil
|
|-
|Win
|align=center|9–0
|Angel Orellana
|Decision (unanimous)
|Bitetti Combat 9 - Middleweight Combat Cup
|
|align=center|2
|align=center|5:00
|Rio de Janeiro, Brazil
|
|-
|Win
|align=center|8–0
|Daniel Acácio
|Decision (unanimous)
|WFE 8 - Platinum
|
|align=center|5
|align=center|5:00
|Salvador, Brazil
|
|-
|Win
|align=center|7–0
|Cristiano Lazzarini
|Decision (unanimous)
|Brasil Fight 2 - Minas Gerais vs. Rio de Janeiro
|
|align=center| 3
|align=center| 5:00
|Belo Horizonte, Brazil
| 
|-
|Win
|align=center|6–0
|Michele Verginelli
|Decision (unanimous)
|WFE - Win Fight and Entertainment 5
|
|align=center|5
|align=center|5:00
|Salvador, Brazil
|
|-
|Win
|align=center|5–0
|Danilo Pereira
|Decision (unanimous)
|WFE - Win Fight and Entertainment 4
|
|align=center|5
|align=center|5:00
|Salvador, Brazil
|
|-
|Win
|align=center| 4–0
|Eder Jones
|Decision (unanimous)
|WFE - Win Fight and Entertainment 3
|
|align=center|3
|align=center|5:00
|Salvador, Brazil
|
|-
|Win
|align=center|3–0
|Neilson Gomes
|TKO (corner stoppage)
|WFE - Win Fight and Entertainment 1
|
|align=center|2
|align=center|5:00
|Salvador, Brazil
|
|-
|Win
|align=center|2–0
|Edilberto de Oliveira
|Decision (unanimous)
|Prime - MMA Championship 2
|
|align=center|3
|align=center|5:00
|Salvador, Brazil
|
|-
|Win
|align=center| 1–0
|Cristiano Nuno
|Submission
|Prime - MMA Championship
|
|align=center|2
|align=center|
|Salvador, Brazil
|
|}

References

External links
 
 

1987 births
Living people
Brazilian male mixed martial artists
Middleweight mixed martial artists
Mixed martial artists utilizing Brazilian jiu-jitsu
Ultimate Fighting Championship male fighters
Brazilian practitioners of Brazilian jiu-jitsu
People awarded a black belt in Brazilian jiu-jitsu